This is a list of schools in the city of Pasig, Metro Manila, Philippines.

Tertiary schools, colleges and universities

Technical and vocational schools

Primary and secondary schools
These are schools that offer Kindergarten, Grade 1–6, Grade 7–10, and/or Grade 11–12 education:

Abundant Life Faith Christian Learning School, Inc.
Academia de Sta. Martha, Inc.
Accelerate Pre School (Splendor Coeli Montessori School)
Access Computer and Technical Colleges-Pasig Campus
Addition Hills Elementary School
ADT Montessori School
Advancing and Nurturing Tots in School, Inc.
Affordable Private Education Center, Inc. (APEC Schools)
Aheadstart Child Development Center
Alphabet House Child Care Center, Inc.
AMA Education Corporation
Ange Cursed Image Public School

Angioletto Preschool, Inc.
Arellano University Pasig (Andres Bonifacio Campus)
Asia Academic Integrated School, Inc.
Asia Pacific Accelerated Christian School
Asia Source iCollege, Inc.
Asian Institute of Computer Studies - Shaw Blvd.
Asian Summit College Foundation, Inc.
Bagong Ilog Elementary School
Bambang Elementary School
Banzuela Preparatory School, Inc.	
Barney Metamorphosis Learning Academy
Blessed Pedro Calungsod Academy
Bower Pros Core Learning CTR
Brentwood Learning Center
Brickhouse Integrated Preschool
Bright I Educare, Inc.
Buenmar Learning Center, Inc.
Busy Bees Learninghive, Inc.
Buting Elementary School
Calvary Christian School of Pasig, Inc.
Caniogan Elementary School
Capellan Institute of Technology, Inc.
Casa de Instruccion Montessori, Inc.
CCF Life Academy Foundation, Inc.
Child Shapers Learning Center
Child's School for the Practice of Appropriate Childhood Education (SPACE), Inc.
Christian Bible Heritage Learning Center of Pasig, Inc.
Colegio del Buen Consejo
College of Arts & Sciences of Asia & the Pacific
Creative Beginners Learning Center
Creative Learning School, Inc.
Creative Space Center for Integrated Learning for Children, Inc.
D' Paul Kiddie Center
Datamex College of Computer Technology-Brgy. San Jose, Pasig
Datamex Institute of Computer Technology-Kapasigan, Pasig
De Castro Elementary School
Dean Learning School, Inc.
Dee Hwa Liong Academy (DEECO), Inc.
Dela Paz Elementary School
Discovery Integrated Academy
Divine Wisdom Christian Altruism Academy, Inc.
Domuschola School
Dr. Sixto Antonio Elementary School
Dunwoody Educational Foundation, Inc.
El Elyon Learning Center, Inc.
El Tres Eres Cencia Escuela
Emerald Learning Center
Emerald Valley Christian Academy
Escuela Catolica de San Sebastian
Escuela de Sto. Rosario, Inc.
Faith of Glory Learning Center, Inc.
Franciscan Angel School of Pasig
Francisco Legaspi Memorial School
Full House Learning Center, Inc.
Gateways Institute of Science and Technology, Inc.
Gemille School of Pasig, Inc.
Glo-Vic Learning Center, Inc.
Global Culinary & Hospitality Academy, Inc.-Pasig Branch
God's Grace Christian School, Inc.
God's Shepherd Learning Center, Inc.
Golden Values School
Good Shepherd Montessori School of Pasig, Inc.
Grace Woods School Academy, Inc.
Greenville College
Greenwoods Kiddie Center of the Sacred Heart
Guardian Angel Learning Center of Pasig, Inc.
Happy Home Learning Center
Happy Kids Integrated School
Herusalem Academy, Inc.
Holy Family Parochial School of Kapitolyo
Holy Light School
Holy Spirit Academy of Pasig
Holy Word Academy
Huckleberry Friends' Learning Center
Humpty-Dumpty School
Ilugin Elementary School
Infotech College Institute of Arts and Sciences-Pasig
Inocencio School, Inc.
Jesus Reigns Ministries God's Light Christian School, Inc.
Kalawaan Elementary School
Kiddstuff Learning Zone, Inc.
Kidscoco Pre-School, Inc.
King Solomon Wisdom School of Pasig
La Consolacion College Pasig
La Immaculada Concepcion School
La Sagesse Foundation, Inc.
Lanie Casipe Learning Center, Inc.
Le Claire Preschool, Inc.
Learners' Town Of Wisdom Academy, Inc.
Learning Jungle Preschool Center
Li'l Angels Pre-School
Liberato Damian Elementary School
Liberi Playschool & Learning Center
Liberty Baptist Academy
Life Giver Christian Learning Academy
Lifeway Baptist Academy
Light of Life Christian School
Little Lambs Learning Center
Lord's Hand Academy , Inc.	
Lux Et Sal Corporation
Makabata School Foundation, Inc.
Manggahan High School
Maranatha Christian Academy of Pasig, Inc.
Mariam Claire Integrated Academy
MC Lorenze Academy, Inc.
MFI Polytechnic Institute, Inc.
Mona Lisa Academy
Montessori Professional College Pasig
Niño Jesus House of Studies, Inc.
Our Lady of Perpetual Help School
Pamantasan ng Lungsod ng Pasig
Pasig Catholic College
Pasig Christian Academy
Pasig City Science High School
Pasig Community School Foundation, Inc.
Pasig Green Pasture Christian School
Pinagbuhatan High School
Prince N' Princess School
Riversprings School, Inc.
Rizal Experimental Station And Pilot School for Cottage Industries (RESPSCI)
Rizal High School
Rizal Technological University-Pasig
Sacred Heart Academy of Pasig, Inc.
Saint John Bosco Institute of Arts and Sciences, Inc.-Rotonda
San Lorenzo Ruiz Senior High School
Spark School
St. Chamuel Institute of Technology
St. John Mission School
St. John's Academy Senior High School, Inc.
St. Paul College of Pasig
St. Theodore Perpetual School, Inc.
St. William School of Pasig
Sta. Marta Educational Center, Inc.
Santa Rosa Catholic School
Sto. Niño the Shepherd School, Inc.
Sto. Tomas de Villanueva Parochial School
Ugong Pasig National High School
University of Asia and the Pacific

International schools
BGC Kids Academy International, Inc.
Domuschola International School
Kido Interactive Learning Zone
Kids' Haven Intervention and Learning Center, Inc.
Lincolnshire Internationale Preschool
Reedley International School
Romarinda International School
GCF International Christian School
Saint Gabriel International School
Victory Christian International School

See also
List of schools in Metro Manila (primary and secondary)
List of international schools in Metro Manila
List of universities and colleges in Metro Manila

References

External links
List of schools – Department of Education (Philippines) list – Search for Region: NCR, Pasig

Pasig